Jan of the Big Snows is a 1922 American silent northern drama film directed by Charles M. Seay and starring Warner Richmond, Louise Prussing and Richard Neill.

Cast
 Warner Richmond as 	Jan Allaire
 Louise Prussing as 	Nancy Cummings
 William Peavey as Frederick Cummings
 Baby Eastman Haywood as 	Freddie
 Frank Robbins as Mukee
 Richard Neill as Blanding

References

Bibliography
 Connelly, Robert B. The Silents: Silent Feature Films, 1910-36, Volume 40, Issue 2. December Press, 1998.
 Munden, Kenneth White. The American Film Institute Catalog of Motion Pictures Produced in the United States, Part 1. University of California Press, 1997.

External links
 

1922 films
1922 drama films
1920s English-language films
American silent feature films
Silent American drama films
American black-and-white films
Films directed by Charles M. Seay
Films set in Canada
1920s American films